The 2009 Aegon Classic is a tennis tournament being played on outdoor grass courts. It was the 28th edition of the event, known that year as the Aegon Classic,  It is taking place at the Edgbaston Priory Club in Birmingham, United Kingdom from 8 to 14 June 2009. Thirteenth-seeded Magdaléna Rybáriková won the singles title.

Entrants

Seeds

 Seedings are based on the rankings as of May 25, 2009.

Other entrants
The following players received wildcards into the main draw:

  Katie O'Brien 
  Georgie Stoop 
  Elena Baltacha
  Naomi Cavaday

The following players received entry from the qualifying draw:

  Arantxa Parra Santonja
  Youlia Fedossova
  Lilia Osterloh
  Naomi Broady
  Chanelle Scheepers
  Carly Gullickson
  Tatiana Poutchek
  Anastasia Rodionova

Finals

Singles

 Magdaléna Rybáriková defeated  Li Na, 6–0, 7–6(7–2)
It was Rybáriková's first career title.

Doubles

 Cara Black /  Liezel Huber defeated  Raquel Kops-Jones /  Abigail Spears, 6–1, 6–4

External links
Official website
Qualifying draw
Order of play

Aegon Classic
Aegon Classic
Birmingham Classic (tennis)
Aegon Classic
Birm